Jawahar Navodaya Vidyalaya, South 24 Parganas or locally called as JNV Jibantala is a boarding, co-educational  school in South 24 Parganas district of West Bengal in India. Navodaya Vidyalayas are funded by the Indian Ministry of Human Resources Development and administered  by Navodaya Vidyalaya Samiti, an autonomous body under the ministry of Education. Many alumnus of this school are currently pursuing degree  from India's top Universities, Medical Colleges, NIT,IIT's.

History 
The school was founded in 2009, and is a part of Jawahar Navodaya Vidyalaya schools. This school is administered and monitored by Patna regional office of Navodaya Vidyalaya Smiti.

Affiliations 
JNV South 24 Parganas is affiliated to Central Board of Secondary Education with affiliation number 2440018.

See also 

 List of JNV schools
 Jawahar Navodaya Vidyalaya, North 24 Parganas

References

External links 

 Official Website of JNV South 24 Parganas

Boarding schools in West Bengal
High schools and secondary schools in West Bengal
South 24 Parganas
Schools in South 24 Parganas district
Educational institutions established in 2009
2009 establishments in West Bengal